The 1979 South Australian state election was held on 15 September 1979.

Retiring Members

Labor
Glen Broomhill MHA (Henley Beach)
Reg Groth MHA (Salisbury)
Charles Harrison MHA (Albert Park)
Jack Olson MHA (Semaphore)
Don Simmons MHA (Peake)
Geoff Virgo MHA (Ascot Park)
Charles Wells MHA (Florey)
Don Banfield MLC
Tom Casey MLC

Liberal
Howard Venning MHA (Rocky River)
Jessie Cooper MLC
Richard Geddes MLC

House of Assembly
Sitting members are shown in bold text. Successful candidates are highlighted in the relevant colour. Where there is possible confusion, an asterisk (*) is also used.

Legislative Council
Sitting members are shown in bold text. Tickets that elected at least one MLC are highlighted in the relevant colour. Successful candidates are identified by an asterisk (*). Eleven seats were up for election. The Labor Party was defending four seats. The Liberal Party was defending six seats. There was one additional new seat, not held by any party.

References

Candidates for South Australian state elections
1979 elections in Australia
1970s in South Australia